The Design Museum in Kensington, London exhibits product, industrial, graphic, fashion, and architectural design. In 2018, the museum won the European Museum of the Year Award. The museum operates as a registered charity, and all funds generated by ticket sales aid the museum in curating new exhibitions.

History

The museum was founded in 1989 by Sir Terence Conran, with Stephen Bayley was inaugural CEO, after the two men had collaboratively created the highly successful exhibition space known as The Boilerhouse at the Victoria and Albert Museum (V&A).

Shad Thames site

The museum was originally housed in a former 1940s banana warehouse on the south bank of the River Thames in the Shad Thames area in SE1 London. The conversion of this warehouse altered it beyond recognition, to resemble a building in the International Modernist style of the 1930s. This was funded by many companies, designers and benefactors. The museum was principally designed by the Conran group, with exhibitions over two floors, and a “Design Museum Tank” exhibition space out by the waterfront. A large scale sculpture titled Head of Invention by Sir Eduardo Paolozzi was installed in the area between the museum and the Thames.

Kensington site

In June 2011, Sir Terence Conran donated £17.5 million to enable the museum to move in 2016 from the warehouse to a larger site which formerly housed the Commonwealth Institute in west London. This landmark from the 1960s, a Grade II* listed building, designed by Robert Matthew/Sir Robert Matthew, Johnson-Marshall and Partners architects that had stood vacant for over a decade, was developed by a design team led by John Pawson. Fit-out of the Design Museum's new home was carried out by Willmott Dixon Interiors.

The Design Museum opened in its Kensington location on 24 November 2016. The move gave the museum three times more space than in its previous location at Shad Thames, with the new Swarovski Foundation Centre for Learning, 202-seat Bakala Auditorium and a dedicated gallery to display its permanent collection, accessible free of charge. The new building was the subject of a profile on the Sky Arts programme The Art of Architecture in 2019.

The move brought the museum into Kensington's cultural quarter, joining the Royal College of Art, V&A, Science Museum, Natural History Museum and Serpentine Gallery.

Deyan Sudjic succeeded Alice Rawsthorn as Director of the Design Museum in 2006. In 2016 Alice Black was appointed Co-Director. In 2019, Tim Marlow was appointed as Director and Chief Executive.

Galleries

The top-floor space under the museum roof houses a permanent display, Designer Maker User, with key objects from the museum's collection. A restaurant, members’ lounge, residency studio and an events and gallery space are also located on the top floor.

On the first floor, a design and architecture reference library is a resource for students, educators, researchers and designers. It will also include archive material relating to the history of the museum. The Swarovski Foundation Centre for Learning is a suite of learning facilities including a Design Studio, Creative Workshop, two seminar rooms and a Common Room. The Design Museum offices and main reception, a meeting room and a film studio are also located on the first floor.

On the ground floor, the largest gallery in the new Design Museum showcases a programme of temporary exhibitions. Accessible from both Kensington High Street and Holland Park, the atrium acts as an events space. A main staircase from the atrium gives access to all floors and offers views to the first and second floors and the hyperbolic paraboloid roof.

A double-height space spanning the two lower levels, Gallery Two hosts a programme of temporary exhibitions dedicated to architecture, fashion, furniture, product and graphic design. The Bakala Auditorium seats 202 people and provide a purpose-designed space for a programme of talks, seminars, debates and public and private events throughout the year. The basement accommodates a collections store, exhibition preparation spaces and a locker area for visitors.

Award schemes
The Design Museum has an award scheme which Brit Insurance sponsored from 2003 until 2011.

Designers of the Year

2003 Jony Ive
2004 Daniel Brown
2005 Hilary Cottam
2006 Jamie Hewlett
2009 Duarte Ferreira

Design of the Year

Designs produced over the previous twelve months worldwide are eligible. A number of design experts are invited to nominate up to five projects each, falling into the seven categories of Architecture, Transport, Graphics, Interactive, Product, Furniture and Fashion. Since 2015 there have been six categories: architecture, fashion, graphics, digital, product and transport. Beazley Insurance became exhibition sponsor in 2016.

2008 The 'One Laptop Per Child' project, designed by Yves Béhar for Fuseproject
2009 Barack Obama poster designed by Shepard Fairey
2010 Folding Plug designed by Min-Kyu Choi
2011 Plumen 001 lightbulb, designed by Samuel Wilkinson and Hulger
2012 The London 2012 Olympic Torch, designed by BarberOsgerby
2013 The website "GOV.UK", designed by the Government Digital Service
2014 The Heydar Aliyev Center in Baku, Azerbaijan designed by architect Zaha Hadid
2015 Human-organs-on-Chips designed by Donald Ingber and Dan Dongeun Huh
2020 Teeter-Totter Wall, designed by California-based architects Ronald Rael and Virginia San Fratello.

See also
Design Council exhibition centre

References

External links

 

1989 establishments in England
Art museums established in 1989
British design
Charities based in London
Design museums
Museums in the Royal Borough of Kensington and Chelsea
Art museums and galleries in London
Grade II* listed buildings in the Royal Borough of Kensington and Chelsea
Grade II* listed museum buildings